Greece women's national under-17 football team represents Greece in international youth football competitions.

Players

Current squad
 The following 20 players were called up for the 2023 UEFA Women's Under-17 Championship qualification Round 2, to be played 24 to 30 March 2023.

Coaching staff

Current coaching staff

FIFA U-17 Women's World Cup

The team has never qualified for the  FIFA U-17 Women's World Cup

UEFA Women's Under-17 Championship

The team has never qualified

See also
Greece women's national football team
Greece women's national under-19 football team

References

External links

U17
Youth football in Greece
Women's national under-17 association football teams